Charles Jeremy Wollaston Geidt (25 February 1930 – 6 August 2013) was a British-born American stage actor, comedian and acting coach. He was a Professor of Acting at Yale University, and later at Harvard University, being a founding member of both the American Repertory Theater and the Yale Repertory Theatre.

Biography 

Jeremy Geidt was born in London in 1930, to financier Frederick Bernard Geidt,  (1892-1955) and (Caroline) Audrey Willmer (1897-1992), daughter of Charles P. White, a physician to the Royal Family. His first cousin, Mervyn Bernard Geidt (1926-1991), was father of Christopher Geidt, Baron Geidt, private secretary to Elizabeth II from 2007 to 2017.

Diagnosed as dyslexic in his youth, he left Wellington College at the age of 16. He auditioned and was accepted into The Old Vic School, where he would later teach under Michel Saint-Denis. He married, had a daughter with actress Patricia Kneale, and divorced. Around 1961, after appearing in stage and television productions, he began to tour with the satirical ensemble "The Establishment", comprising Geidt, Eleanor Bron, John Bird and John Fortune. The group toured in the U.S., where he met his second wife Jan Graham in Washington, D.C.

Geidt stayed in the States, becoming a founding member of the Yale Repertory Theatre in 1966. He became a professor of acting at Yale University's School of Drama. He went on to become a founding member of the American Repertory Theater and an acting instructor at its Institute for Advanced Theater Training. He was also taught acting at Harvard University in 1998. Of his students in his 2000 American Repertory Theater acting workshop, Geidt stated, "I'm hoping they come away with their imaginations touched, enlarged and having experienced something that is, hopefully, joyful...with something they found within themselves — or in the text — that they didn't know they had."

Around 2000, Geidt was diagnosed with cancer. However, he refused to stop performing. On 6 August 2013, he suffered a heart attack and died at his home in Cambridge, Massachusetts. He was 83 years old and is survived by his wife Jan, their two daughters, and his daughter by Kneale.

Acting career

Film and television
Although Geidt preferred a life on the stage, he appeared in minor roles in several television series, films, and videos including:

The Old & The New (2009), co-starring his wife, Jan.
Next Stop Wonderland (1998)
The Spanish Prisoner (1997)
Private Potter (1962)
So Little Time (1952)

Partial stage work

With the American Repertory Theater 
Sources:About the Artists: Jeremy Geidt. Retrieved 8 August 2013.

 Cabaret as Max (2010)
 The Seagull as Sorin (2009)
 Julius Caesar as Cicero (2008)
 The Onion Cellar (2007)
 Three Sisters as Ferapont (2006)
 A Midsummer Night's Dream as Quince/Snug (2004)
 Loot as Truscott (2000)
 Ivanov as Lebedev (2000)
 Man and Superman as Mendoza/Devil (1997)
 Buried Child as Dodge (1996)
 The Threepenny Opera as Peachum/Petey (1995)
 Major Barbara as Undershaft 
 Heartbreak House as Shotover
 Henry IV as Falstaff
 Twelfth Night as Toby Belch
 The Caretaker as Davies
 The Homecoming as Max
 Waiting for Godot as Vladimir
 The Cherry Orchard as Gaev

Awards 
 Elliot Norton Award for Outstanding Actor (1992)
Elliot Norton Award in memory (2014)

References

External links 

 Geidt's biography at American Repertory Theater
 On the Cutting Edge of History – Innovation at Harvard (video narrated by Geidt)
Some thoughts from one of Michel Saint-Denis’s students by Geidt
Jeremy Geidt and 'The Establishment' cast at the National Portrait Gallery
 A letter of recommendation by Geidt

1930 births
2013 deaths
Male actors from Cambridge, Massachusetts
Male actors from London
English emigrants to the United States
Yale University faculty
Harvard University faculty
Drama teachers
English male stage actors